The 2017 Sydney to Hobart Yacht Race was the 73rd annual running of the Sydney to Hobart Yacht Race. Hosted by the Cruising Yacht Club of Australia and sponsored by Rolex, it began at Sydney Harbour at 13:00 on 26 December 2017, before heading south for  via the Tasman Sea, Bass Strait, Storm Bay and up the River Derwent, to cross the finish line in Hobart, Tasmania.

A fleet of 102 boats contested the race and 96 finished. These included past winners Wizard, Perpetual LOYAL (now InfoTrack), Wild Oats XI, Black Jack, LDV Comanche and Kialoa II. Wild Oats XI was the first to cross the finish line at 1:08:48:50, a new record, but the crew of the LDV Comanche lodged a protest against Wild Oats XI after nearly being hit at the start of the race. Wild Oats XI incurred a 1 hour penalty, putting them behind winner LDV Comanche by 33 minutes and 26 seconds for line honours. LDV Comanche also claimed the time record of 1:09:15:24. Ichi Ban (Matt Allen) was awarded Tattersall's Cup.

Results

Line honours (first 10)

Handicap results (Top 10)

References

Sydney to Hobart Yacht Race
Sydney
Sydney
Ocean
Oceania